"Private School Kid" is an alternative rock song performed by Australian Sarah McLeod featuring Chris Cheney from The Living End. The song was released in July 2005 as the second single from McLeod's debut studio album, Beauty Was a Tiger (2005). The song peaked at number 33 on the Australian ARIA Singles Chart.

Track listing
CD Single (022132)
 "Private School Kid"	
 "Demolition Waltz" 	
 "Private School Kid"  (Demo)  	
 "Let's Get Together  (Behind the Scenes and Video)

Charts

References

2005 singles
2005 songs
Songs written by Sarah McLeod (musician)
Mushroom Records singles